Yvonne Marie Sanchez (born December 5, 1967) is an American basketball coach who is currently an assistant women's basketball coach at Arizona State.

Career
From 2011 to 2016, Sanchez was head coach at New Mexico.

After leaving New Mexico, Sanchez returned to her alma mater Eldorado High School in Albuquerque, initially as an educational assistant for students who have autism. In June 2016, she became a volunteer assistant boys' basketball coach at Eldorado High on the staff of her brother Roy Sanchez.

On July 2, 2018, Sanchez joined the staff of Kim Barnes Arico at Michigan as an assistant coach.
On April 29, 2021, Sanchez left Michigan to become an assistant coach at Arizona State under Charli Turner Thorne.

Head coaching record

References

1967 births
Living people
United States International University alumni
American women's basketball coaches
Basketball coaches from New Mexico
Basketball players from New Mexico
College women's basketball players in the United States
New Mexico Lobos women's basketball coaches
New Mexico State Aggies women's basketball coaches
San Diego State Aztecs women's basketball coaches
University of New Mexico faculty
Michigan Wolverines women's basketball coaches
People from Los Alamos, New Mexico
American women academics
Arizona State Sun Devils women's basketball coaches